Alternate air ticket purchasing order systems allow for alternative ways of purchasing air tickets and GDS Connectivity not involving Internet or personal TA contact.

Mobile booking
Mobile booking of flight tickets and other facilities, for example reviewing flight schedules and comparing fares, can be done using the mobile phone. The importance of mobile booking has increased significantly in the last years. Especially business travelers who use mobile devices too book additional services or to check their flight status.

SMS: A short code can be sent to the TA provided code with specific parameters to receive the required information.

Example: Cleartrip provides a facility to send an SMS to 667744 with source, destination, date and month. The reply comes with a list of flight codes and time of departure, all sorted by price in ascending order. This service is available to Cleartrip’s customers having Airtel, BPL, Hutch and Reliance connection.

Interactive voice response: A specific number provided by the carrier can be called, and an Interactive Voice Response (IVR) asks questions and guides the user through. The IVR can also take the payment details and process the payment. The e-ticket can be sent as an email or collected over the counter.

Shanghai SmartPay Jieyin has partnered with Lu Hai Kong travel agency in Hefei, Anhui Province, to jointly launch mobile and telephone based payment systems for airline electronic tickets. As part of the launch promotion, customers who buy airline e-ticket in Lu Hai Kong ticket agency and process payment via interactive voice response (IVR).

Smart card
A smart card (also known as chip card or integrated circuit card-ICC), is a pocket-sized card with embedded integrated circuits to process information. It can receive input, process it using the ICC applications, then deliver the output. The airline smart card enables quick and easy passenger identification; allowing them to obtain a ticket and pay for other products and services. The smart card provides airlines the opportunity to increase savings in distribution costs, provide better security against fraud, allow more access to self-service facilities, and provide a better means to identify their frequent travelers.

Examples: Air France has issued smart cards to frequent flyers on its routes from Paris Orly to Marseille and Toulouse. The card is a contact-less smart card using the Mifare radio frequency technology, similar to the Lufthansa card. Gemplus supplied the cards. The card has been used as passenger identification, the ticket and boarding authority. ANA and Japan Airlines integrate smart cards into their frequent flyer cards,  Mifare also offers integration with mobile phones that support it, for the same purpose on a far wider selection of domestic routes in Japan.

GDS-developed application
Global Distribution System (GDS) provides applications that participating carriers can purchase and use to inform its passengers by means of alerts on their mobile phones. The alerts can be for flight delays, terminal/gate changes, flight cancellations, airport/airline alerts, city/country security alerts, as well as a trip reminder service. Alerts may be private or custom branded with contact information and can be sent via Voice, e-mail, fax or Short Messaging System (SMS). Customized alerts or marketing messages may be also created to get in touch with the passengers anywhere they may be; Patheo offers this same application. The alerts may be delivered to travelers via WML and HTML phones, Web-enabled PDAs and RIM Blackberry devices. Any device that receives e-mail or SMS (AOL, MSN, Yahoo, ICQ) can receive Alert Notifications.

Example: Sabre InformSM mobile service is a solution that provides the participating carriers passengers with access to their travel plans 24 hours a day, 7 days a week. Mobile services for the customers can be enabled at minimal cost, time and effort. There is no hardware or software to purchase, no developers to train and no systems to maintain and operate. Convenient, efficient and easy to implement, Sabre InformSM helps foster long-term customer relationships and maintain a distinct competitive advantage.

Airline-developed application
A software application can be installed on a phone, providing access to a specific airline’s reservation system, allowing the user to book, pay and generate e-tickets via their mobile phone. This requires a JAVA enabled handset with GPRS connection.

Phone manufacturer/GDS developed application
Mobile phone manufacturers generally provide integrated software for the use of applications like MS Office, and also for connecting to the Internet using GPRS on WAP. These applications may also provide pre-programmed interface to a GDS. Using this feature, travel plans can be made, schedules can be seen, and tickets can be booked.

Example: Sabre Holdings signed an agreement with Motorola to power its Mobile Office Solution with travel and ticketing capabilities for mobile professionals. Motorola’s integration with Sabre's wireless travel is a part of their Travel Connector component of the Mobile Office Solution. Patheo (Patheo GDS) also has a similar technology using mobile office electric transactions on current GDS solutions.

Motorola and WORLDSPAN furnish travel information via Motorola's Internet-access-enabled wireless devices. Through Motorola's Mobile Internet Exchange communications platform (also known as the MIX platform) and its enhanced voice capabilities, carriers are able to offer their customers access to WORLDSPAN's travel services through any phone. WORLDSPAN is the first travel channel provider of the core content for Motorola's MIX platform.

WAP sites of GDS
The WAP versions of GDS provides use to mobile phones to surf the site on their GPRS mobile phones.
 
Example: Amadeus, a Spanish-based technology provider for the travel and tourism industries, is live with its Wireless Travel Management (WTM) system together with Scandinavian regional carrier Wideroe. The system enables Wideroe's customers to check flight availability and book or cancel flights with over 500 airlines around the globe using a WAP-enabled mobile device. In addition, passengers traveling with Wideroe can receive real-time updates about flight departure and arrival times. WTM was developed jointly by Amadeus and Ericsson and Smart, a Swedish telecoms systems provider, Amadeus' Scandinavian and Baltic distribution partner.

References

Airline tickets